Karl Erik Olof (Olle) Engstrand (born 24 August 1943 in Uppsala) is Professor Emeritus of Phonetics at Stockholm University.

See also
History of Phonetics

References

1943 births
Living people
Academic staff of Stockholm University
People from Uppsala